The Yamaha XJ900 is a motorcycle manufactured by Yamaha from 1983. It was a development of the original Yamaha XJ model, the XJ 650, which was the foundation for the entire XJ series.

In its original incarnation, the XJ900 had an air-cooled, double overhead camshaft,  4-stroke, 4-cylinder, 8-valve engine. Originally fitted with a handlebar mounted bikini fairing, its handling came in for criticism. This was quickly replaced with a frame mounted upper fairing and retrofitted to all models. The 1983 XJ900 came with anti-dive front forks, shaft drive and has triple disc brakes (2 front, 1 rear).

A revised version was launched in 1984 and displaced . Aside from the engine capacity increase it was equipped with more conventional forks than its predecessor and a belly pan came as standard. The increase in engine capacity meant the carburettors went up from 35 mm to 36 mm. Fuel capacity is 22 litres and the transmission is a 5-speed. Aside from these changes it was nearly identical to the original and was manufactured until 1994.

The XJ900 Diversions were their replacements.

Model engine and frame codes
1983 to 1984 - 853 cc 31A

1984 to 1990 - 891 cc 58L

1990 to 1994 - 891 cc 4BB1

See also
 Yamaha motorcycles

References

XJ900
Motorcycles introduced in 1983
Standard motorcycles